Kory is a unisex given name. It is a male version of the name Cora, which has Greek origins and is the maiden name of the goddess Persephone. The name also can have origins from the Gaelic word coire, which means "in a caidron", or "In a hollow".  Notable people with the name include:

People 

Kory Falite (born 1986), American ice hockey player
Kory Johnson, American environmentalist
Kory Karlander (born 1972), Canadian ice hockey player
Kory Kath (born 1977), American politician
Kory Kocur (born 1969), Canadian ice hockey player
Kory Lichtensteiger (born 1985), American football player
Kory Minor (born 1976), American football player
Kory Roberts (born 1997), English footballer
Kory Scoran (born 1981), Canadian ice hockey player
Kory Sheets (born 1985), American football player
Kory Stamper, lexicographer, former Merriam-Webster associate editor and author
Kory Tarpenning (born 1962), American pole vaulter
Kory Teneycke (born 1974), Canadian media executive and former Director of Communications for Prime Minister Stephen Harper

Fictional characters 

 Kory (Princess Koriand'r of Tamaran), "Teen Titans" "Starfire (Teen Titans)" comic book character since 1980

See also
 Korie, given name and surname
 Korey, given name and surname
 Cory, given name
 Corey, given name and surname

References